Ek Tha Dil Ek Thi Dhadkan is an unreleased Hindi romance film directed by Shahrukh Sultan and starring Biswajeet, Rajendra Kumar, Arbaaz Ali Khan, Isha Koppikar and late Inder Kumar  in lead roles.

Music
"Baahon Mein Aao" - Kavita Krishnamurthy, Abhijeet
"Badal Baharein" - Kavita Krishnamurthy, Udit Narayan
"Ek Tha Dil Ek Thi Dhadkan" - Kumar Sanu
"O Mere Dulhe Raja" - Kavita Krishnamurthy, Jojo, Nayan Rathod
"Resham Jaisi" - Abhijeet
"Tum To Chal Diye" - Udit Narayan
"Zindagi Ke Geet" - Udit Narayan

References

External links

1998 films
1990s Hindi-language films
Films scored by Anand Raj Anand